Cholo is a video game released in 1986 for the BBC Micro. It was ported to the ZX Spectrum, Amstrad CPC, and Commodore 64. Cholo  uses wireframe 3D visuals and has nonlinear gameplay.

Gameplay 
The story is set out in a novella which was included in the game's packaging. Following a nuclear war, humanity is trapped underground by a robot defence system that rules the irradiated surface. Your character assumes control of a robot drone, transmitting to a terminal below ground, and is given the task of freeing the trapped humans.

The robot—"Rizzo the rat", a diagnostic model—is equipped with a single laser, computer/robot link capabilities and very limited armour. The player's first task is to explore the city and take over stronger robots in order to complete the mission. Gameplay consists of movement around a virtual 3D world, taking over other robots by shooting them until 'paralysed', running into them and entering a password to gain access.

Each robot has different properties. "Aviata" is an aircraft who can fly and transport other robots; "Igor" is a hacker who can access computer systems. The player can only control one robot at a time. All robots have four slots for 'rampacks' which are essentially files, either text files or programs which add extra functionality to your robot. The gameplay often involves swapping between robots in order to complete a certain task.

A deliberately incomplete map showing the pre-war city shipped with the game in the form of an A3 size poster. The map also contains a partial robot identification chart.

Robot types 

There are a number of different robot types in Cholo, nearly all of which can be controlled at some point in the game.

Vidbot - Fixed position camera robot
Leadcoat - Heavy duty radiation proof robot
Ratdroid - Diagnostic robot
Hacker - Hacker robot (unarmed)
Flying Eye - Mobile camera robot
Autodoc - Maintenance robot
Guard - Police robot
Grundon - Police tank robot
Flyboy - Aircraft robot
Ship - Ship robot

Legacy
Ovine by Design published a remake of the game using Tron-like graphics as freeware for Windows, with the approval of the original creators.

References

External links 

Cholo box and manual at C64Sets.com

1986 video games
ZX Spectrum games
BBC Micro and Acorn Electron games
Amstrad CPC games
Commodore 64 games
First-person shooters
Post-apocalyptic video games
Telecomsoft games
Video games developed in the United Kingdom
Adventure games